Waking the Dead is a British television police procedural crime drama series, produced by the BBC, that centres on a fictional London-based Cold Case unit composed of CID police officers, a psychological profiler and a forensic scientist. A pilot episode aired in September 2000, and a total of nine series followed. Each story is split into two hour-long episodes, shown on consecutive nights on BBC One. A third series episode won an International Emmy Award in 2004. The programme was also shown on BBC America in the United States, though these screenings are edited to allow for advertising breaks, as well as UKTV in Australia and New Zealand and ABC1 in Australia. A total of 46 stories aired across the nine series. The show aired its final episode on 11 April 2011. A spin-off from the series, titled The Body Farm, revolving around forensic scientist Eve Lockhart (Tara Fitzgerald), was announced by the BBC in January 2011 and ran for just one series.

In 2018, a five-part radio prequel to the series, The Unforgiven, was broadcast on BBC Radio 4, with Sue Johnston, Claire Goose, Wil Johnson and Holly Aird reprising their roles. All five episodes were written by series creator Barbara Machin. Anthony Howell replaced Trevor Eve in the role of Peter Boyd.

Plot

Overview
The programme follows the work of a special police team that investigates "cold cases", which usually concern murders that took place a number of years ago, and were never solved. The team, composed of head officer Detective Superintendent Peter Boyd (Trevor Eve), psychological profiler Grace Foley (Sue Johnston), Detective Inspector Spencer Jordan (Wil Johnson), as well as a number of other supporting characters, uses evidence which has recently come to light, as well as contemporary technology to examine former evidence.

Initially, Boyd, Grace and Spence were accompanied by junior DC Mel Silver (Claire Goose), and stern forensic scientist Frankie Wharton (Holly Aird), however both left after the end of the fourth series. Felix Gibson (Esther Hall) and Stella Goodman (Félicité du Jeu) replaced them in the fifth series, before Eve Lockhart (Tara Fitzgerald) replaced Felix from the sixth series onwards. Katarina Howard (Stacey Roca) replaced Stella in series eight, while Sarah Cavendish (Eva Birthistle) replaced Katarina in series nine. Although the plotlines generally centre around the case, other storylines have been incorporated across the years, including Boyd's anger management issues and his being re-united with his son, Grace suffering from cancer, Spencer being shot at the hands of one of his former colleagues, and Mel's death, which creates a chain of events lasting across two series.

The show also addressed sensitive issues such as fanaticism within different religions, international organised crime, child abuse within the Catholic Church, war crimes in Bosnia, forced child labour, torture, homophobia and racism. The BBC issued disclaimers twice on the show when it touched upon issues sensitive to the Labour government of the time (once about banking frauds within the City of London establishment and once about the involvement of the UK in the Iraq war). Some of the issues were dealt with through the conflicting views of Peter Boyd (a white middle-class liberal) and Spencer Jordan (a black working-class conservative).

The Body Farm, a spin-off revolving around forensic scientist Eve Lockhart (Tara Fitzgerald), produced by Trevor Eve and made by his production company Projector, was commissioned by the BBC. However, after poor ratings and reviews, it was cancelled after one series.

Cast

Main cast
 Trevor Eve as Det. Supt. Peter Boyd
 Sue Johnston as Grace Foley
 Wil Johnson as DS/DI Spencer Jordan
 Claire Goose as DC/DS Amelia Silver (Series 1–4)
 Holly Aird as Frankie Wharton (Series 1–4)
 Esther Hall as Felix Gibson (Series 5)
 Félicité du Jeu as DC Stella Goodman (Series 5–8)
 Tara Fitzgerald as Eve Lockhart (Series 6–9)
 Stacey Roca as DS Katrina Howard (Series 8)
 Eva Birthistle as Det. Supt. Sarah Cavendish (Series 9)

Recurring cast
 Simon Kunz as DAC Ralph Christie (Series 1)
 George Rainsford as Luke Boyd (Series 7–9)
 Ruth Gemmell as Linda Cummings (Series 7–8)
 Elizabeth Rider as DCC Maureen Smith (Series 8–9)

Characters

Police
Detective Superintendent Peter Boyd is the head of the unit. His involvement in the unit stemmed from the disappearance of his son in the 1990s. Though sometimes appearing detached, Boyd is especially close to his team, and particularly, Mel Silver, whose death haunts him after he is unable to come to terms with it. Boyd's son Luke (called Joe in series 1), is a drug-dependent runaway who disappeared whilst living on the streets, and dies from an overdose in season 7. As a detective superintendent, Boyd is often stern with suspects, and is unafraid to give them a beating. Boyd appeared in every episode.
 Detective Sergeant Spencer Jordan was one of the original officers assigned to the unit when it opened, and soon became Boyd's main sidekick, often joining him in "good-cop-bad-cop" routines in the interview room, and leading the other officers within the team. He was promoted to detective inspector at the start of the fourth series, having initially joined as a detective sergeant. Before joining the unit, Spencer worked for the Atomic Energy Constabulary. Spencer reveals his intention to transfer out of the unit in "End of the Night", but in "Endgame", liaises with the unit during his stint in CID, in order to help Boyd track down Linda Cummings.
 Detective Constable Amelia "Mel" Silver was a feisty, young achiever who worked hard to be promoted from her initial role as constable to sergeant, and who frequently questioned Boyd if she believed he was looking in the wrong direction on a case. She was especially close to Frankie, and the pair soon became best friends. It is revealed that Mel was adopted, as her birth mother was deemed mentally unfit, and that her real name is Mary Price. Mel was killed by a deranged suspect at the end of the fourth series, but Boyd was unable to accept her death until the sixth series, which involves a case she investigated before her death.
 Detective Constable Stella Goodman joined the unit as a permanent replacement for Detective Sergeant Silver, after being interviewed by Boyd and Grace at the start of series five. Boyd was initially hostile towards her, after being unable to accept Mel's death, but eventually came to accept her. Boyd's trust in Stella was betrayed at the end of series five, when it was revealed she had unwittingly sent information on the unit to her godfather, who had been manipulating her to cover up his own corruption. Stella died at the start of series eight, after being shot in the leg by a suspect she was chasing, and suffering thrombosis as a result of the injury.
 Detective Sergeant Katrina Howard appears at the start of the eighth series as a police constable, formerly a member of the Serious Organised Crime Agency, with a history of insubordination. However, she is transferred into the unit at Boyd's request following the death of DC Goodman. Following the temporary departure of Spencer Jordan, Howard has a much more active role to play within the team than her predecessor, as she is the only other active officer aside from Boyd. Howard did not return for the ninth series, as actress Roca decided to leave the show after just one series. Her on-screen departure was never explained.
 Detective Superintendent Sarah Cavendish was transferred into the unit at the start of series nine, to replace Detective Sergeant Howard, having been moved from counter-terrorism after an incident which led to her becoming the scapegoat. She was one of the youngest superintendents in the history of the Met and, until the incident, a high flyer. At the end of the ninth series, she is murdered by Assistant Chief Commissioner Tony Nicholson, due to her knowledge of his crimes, and by spying on his interactions at The Emirates Stadium with one of the antagonists. Her body was planted in Boyd's shed by Nicholson in an attempt to frame him for her murder.

Doctors
 Grace Foley is a psychological profiler, with nearly thirty years' experience in the field. Her presence in the unit provides a rational counter to Boyd's somewhat unorthodox methods, but the pair enjoy a close working relationship and often engage in witty banter. Grace is often able to build a mental profile of the suspect or suspects, allowing Boyd to discover the meaning behind a particular crime or crimes they may have committed. Grace also had a short bout with stomach cancer, which forced her to take time out from the unit to have an operation, from which she fully recovered. Johnston stayed with the programme until its end.
 Frankie Wharton, the unit's first forensic pathologist, took a conscientious approach to her job, but remained stern with her colleagues. Frankie was unafraid to speak her mind, and often offered strong insight into who or what was responsible for the crime. She was good friends with Mel Silver, and it was referenced that she and Mel knew each other before working in the unit. However, traumatised by Mel's death, Frankie chose to leave the unit to return to research, a fact which was explained in the first episode of series five. The real reason for Frankie's departure stemmed from actress Holly Aird's pregnancy.
 Felix Gibson took over as the unit's forensic pathologist after Frankie's departure. Felix had already been with the team for some time at the start of series five, and her introduction following Frankie's departure was never explained on screen. Like her predecessor, she would often leave the office to join her colleagues in the field, but took a less stern role within the team, instead offering the knowledge in a more succinct and insightful way. However, she would not hesitate to stand up to Boyd when necessary. The reason behind Felix's departure was never explained on screen, and actress Esther Hall gave no reason for her decision to leave the show.
 Eve Lockhart took over as the unit's forensic pathologist after Felix's departure, and her first case is shown at the start of series six, with hints that she has in fact already worked with the team for some time. Unlike her predecessors, Eve practices pathology outside of her time in the unit, and even has her own body farm, which allows her to understand the stages of decomposition in different circumstances, from the time of death until as long as five years later. Eve plays a less demanding role in the team than both Frankie and Felix, and instead acts as more of a leader, attracting the team to new cases. Eve also smokes, often in the laboratory, unlike Frankie and Felix. Fitzgerald stayed with the show until its end and went on to revive the character in the spin-off series The Body Farm.

Episodes

Reception
The first series secured strong ratings, with "Burn Out" receiving 8.4 million viewers and a 38% audience share. Persistently high ratings meant the programme was recommissioned each year for either the summer or winter schedule. The sixth series began with strong ratings, with "Wren Boys" achieving 9.2 m viewers and a 35.2% audience share. The second part dropped to 8.6 m, but still gained a 33% audience share. Following the successful transmission of the third series and an International Emmy Award nomination for "Special Relationship" written by Stephen Davis and directed by David Thacker, a further two series were commissioned with the number of stories expanded from four to six. Waking the Dead won an International Emmy Award the following year for "Breaking Glass", written by Stephen Davis and directed by Maurice Phillips, and "Multistorey", written by Ed Whitmore and directed by Bob Bierman.

Home media
All nine series have been released on DVD in the United Kingdom via 2 Entertain Ltd, under the BBC DVD banner. All nine series are also available in a complete boxset. Series one to seven have been released by BBC Video in the United States, while all nine series have been released in Australia via Roadshow.

See also
The Enigma Files, UK / BBC Two, 1980
Cold Squad, CAN / CTV, 1998
Cold Case Files, USA / A&E, 1999 (true cases)
New Tricks, UK / BBC One, 2003
Cold Case, USA / CBS, 2003
Solved, USA / ID, 2008 (true cases)
 Zettai Reido, Japan / Fuji Television, 2010
 Cold Justice, USA / TNT, 2013 (true cases)
 To Catch a Killer, CAN / OWN, 2014 (true cases)
Signal, South Korea / TVN, 2016
Signal, Japan / Fuji TV, 2018
 Silent Witness, UK BBC One, 1996

References

External links

"Shadowplay" shooting script at BBC Writers Room

 
2000 British television series debuts
2011 British television series endings
2000s British crime drama television series
2000s British mystery television series
2000s British police procedural television series
2000s British workplace drama television series
2010s British crime drama television series
2010s British mystery television series
2010s British police procedural television series
2010s British workplace drama television series
BBC crime drama television shows
BBC mystery television shows
English-language television shows
Forensic science in popular culture
International Emmy Award for Best Drama Series winners
Murder in television
Television shows about death
Television shows set in London